Anlo Senior High School, also known as ANSECO, is a mixed public senior high school located at Anloga in the Volta Region of Ghana. It was founded in 1959 by Torgbui Adeladza II, Mr. C. K. Fiagbe and Mr J. W. K. Doe. It was established on 10 April 1959. From a humble beginning, ANSECO has grown to become the fourth largest school in the Volta Region with a student population of 2,293 made up of 1,073 males and 1,220 females.

History 
Anseco was started in 1959 as community school with 30 students in "God Lives House".

See also

 Education in Ghana
 List of Senior High Schools in Ghana

References 

1959 establishments in Ghana
Educational institutions established in 1959
High schools in Ghana
Public schools in Ghana
Education in Volta Region